The ovarian artery is an artery that supplies oxygenated blood to the ovary in females. It arises from the abdominal aorta below the renal artery. It can be found within the suspensory ligament of the ovary, anterior to the ovarian vein and ureter.

Structure
The ovarian arteries are paired structures that arise from the abdominal aorta, usually at the level of L2. After emerging from the aorta, the artery travels within the suspensory ligament of the ovary and enters the mesovarium.

The ovarian arteries are the corresponding arteries in the female to the testicular artery in the male. They are shorter than the testicular arteries, as the testicular arteries courses through the abdominal wall to the external scrotum.

The origin and course of the first part of each artery are the same as those of the testicular artery, but on arriving at the upper opening of the lesser pelvis the ovarian artery passes inward, between the two layers of the ovariopelvic ligament and of the broad ligament of the uterus, to be distributed to the ovary.

Anastamoses 
The ovarian artery may anastamose with the uterine artery in the broad ligament. This is thus an anastamosis between the abdominal aorta and the anterior internal iliac artery.

Branches
Small branches are given to the ureter and the uterine tube, and one passes on to the side of the uterus, and unites with the uterine artery.  Other offsets are continued on the round ligament of the uterus, through the inguinal canal, to the integument of the labium majus and groin.

Variance
In 20%, they arise from the renal arteries (inferior polar). Uncommonly they may arise from adrenal, lumbar, or internal iliac arteries.

Function
The ovarian artery supplies blood to the ovary and uterus. The ovarian arteries swell during pregnancy, in order to increase the uterine blood supply.

Additional images

See also

References

External links
 "Anastomoses Between Utero - Ovarian Arteries, Variations" at anatomyatlases.org
 
 

Arteries of the abdomen